"Figure of Eight" is a song from Paul McCartney's 1989 album, Flowers in the Dirt. After the completion of the album, McCartney recorded a new version for single release, using his newly formed touring band. The single version is unusual in running nearly two minutes longer than the album version, rather than following the typical radio edit pattern of shortening the track for single release. Despite this quirk, the single reached number 42 on the UK singles chart and number 92 on the Billboard Hot 100.

"Figure of Eight" was the opening song throughout McCartney's 1989–1990 world concert tour. A version recorded in Rotterdam on 10 November 1989 appeared on the live album from the tour, Tripping the Live Fantastic.

Music video

The official music video for the song was directed by Andy Morahan and shows footage from the concert at Hallenstadion, Zurich on October 29, 1989.

Track listings
This song was released as a 7" single, a 12" maxi-single, a cassingle, and a CD single.

7" single
 "Figure of Eight" (7" mix)
 "Où Est le Soleil?"

12" single
 "Figure of Eight" (12" mix)
 "This One" (Club Lovejoys mix)

12" single
 "Figure of Eight" (12" mix)
 "Où Est le Soleil?" (remix by Shep Pettibone)
 "Où Est le Soleil?" (Tub Dub mix) (remix by Pettibone)

CD single
 "Figure of Eight" (12" mix)
 "The Long and Winding Road"
 "Loveliest Thing"

Cassingle
 "Figure of Eight"
 "Où Est le Soleil?"

3" CD single
 "Figure of Eight";3" CD single
 "Figure of Eight" (7" mix)
 "Rough Ride"
 "Où Est le Soleil?" (7" mix)

CD single limited edition double pack 3" CD single + 5" CD single
"Figure of Eight";3" CD single
 "Figure of Eight" (7" mix)
 "Rough Ride"
 "Où Est le Soleil?" (7" mix)
"Figure of Eight";3" CD single
 "Figure of Eight" (12" mix)
 "The Long and Winding Road"
 "Loveliest Thing"

Charts

References

1989 songs
1989 singles
Paul McCartney songs
Music published by MPL Music Publishing
Music videos directed by Andy Morahan
Parlophone singles
Song recordings produced by Ross Cullum
Song recordings produced by Chris Hughes (record producer)
Song recordings produced by Paul McCartney
Songs written by Paul McCartney